The Commissioner of Customs and Excise is the head of  the Customs and Excise Department, which is responsible for monitoring the movement of goods into and out of Hong Kong, customs and excise, duties and investigation of pirated products.

List of commissioners

Director of Commerce & Industry and Commissioner of Preventive Service
 David Ronald Holmes (1962–1966)
 Terence Dare Sorby (1966–1970) 
 Jack Cater (1970–1972)
 David Harold Jordan (1972–1977)

Directors of Trade, Industry and Customs and Commissioners of Customs and Excises
 David Harold Jordan (1977–1979)
 William Doward CBE (1979–1982)

Commissioners of Customs and Excise (after 1997)

External links
Hong Kong Customs and Excise
Government of HKSAR
Organisation chart of Hong Kong Government

Customs and Excise